, known by her birth and stage name , is a Japanese actress who  She debuted in 1999 by winning the Da Pump's, ISSA's Sister Role Grand Prix for the movie Dream Maker. She played a lead role in the live action movie of 20th Century Boys as the character Kanna.

Background and personal life
Airi's younger sister Yuna is also an actress.

She is married to Japan international footballer Yuto Nagatomo, who plays for Turkish club Galatasaray. He proposed to her on the San Siro pitch in February 2016 and they registered their marriage in January 2017. She wrapped up her filming commitments and relocated to Italy the following month. The couple have 3 sons.

Both of them appeared in the Captain Tsubasa Olympics special which, aired as part of the annual Jikan Terebi Nihon no Sport wa Tsuyo in November 2019.

Filmography and appearances

TV dramas
 3 nen B gumi Kinpachi sensei 6 As Akane Sasaoka (TBS, 2002), Akane Sasaoka
 Tantei Kazoku (NTV, 2002), Maho Tokura
 Lion Sensei (YTV, 2003), Momoko Enari
 Kuitan 2 Episode 8 (NTV, 2007), Naoko Harada
 Hanazakari no Kimitachi e (Fuji TV, 2007), Erica Abeno
 20th Century Boys (NTV), Kanna Endō
 Mouhitotsu no Dai 1-shō (2009)
 Mouhitotsu no Dai 2-shō (2009)
 Saga: Dai 1-ya (2012)
 Saga: Dai 2-ya (2012)
 Saga: Dai 3-ya (2012)
 Reset Episode 4 (YTV, 2009), Madoka Shimura
 Gyōretsu 48 Jikan (NHK, 2009), Sayaka
 Okabe Keibu Series 4 (Fuji TV, 2009), Mariko Ichijō
 Manyō Love Story Fuyu Episode 2 "Tanada no Marebito" (NHK Nara, 2010), Rika Miyamoto
 Tennōji Broadway (NHK Osaka, 2010)
 Jūi Dolittle Episode 3 (TBS, 2010)
 Hanchō 4: Jinnansho Azumihan Season 4, Episode 9 (TBS, 2011), Kaori Yabuki
 Piece Vote (NTV, 2011), Saki Iwami
 Nazotoki wa Dinner no Ato de Episode 8 (Fuji TV, 2011), Mai Kizaki
 Saiko no Jinsei Episode 5 (TBS, 2012), Erica
 Boys on the Run (TV Asahi, 2012), Hana Ooiwa
 Tokyo Zenryoku Shōjo (NTV, 2012), Aki Ozaki
 Otasukeya Jinpachi (YTV, 2013), Mayumi Ōno
 Mama ni Naritai... (NHK BS Premium, 2013), Konomi Mashita
 Tabemonogatari Kanojo no Kondatechō (NHK BS Premium, 2013)
 Kuroneko, Tokidoki Hanaya (NHK BS Premium, 2013), Kiyoka Hinata
 Tokyo Bandwagon: Shitamachi Daikazoku Monogatari (NTV, 2013), Ami Hotta
 Keisatsu Daigakkou: Hinomaru Kyōju no Jiken Note (TV Tokyo, 2014), Kyōko Teranishi
 Shin Munesue Keiji Series Series 8 "Munesue Keiji no Kuroi Matsuri" (TV Asahi, 2015), Ryōka Ashihara

TV Specials
 Captain Tsubasa (2019)

Movies
 Dreammaker (1999), Ai Sugiura
 Daburusu (2001), Kazumi
 Boutaoshi! (2003), Sayuri Konno
 Warau Michael (2006), Yuzu Sarashina
 20th Century Boys, Kanna
 20th Century Boys (2008)
 20th Century Boys 2: The Last Hope (2009)
 20th Century Boys 3: Redemption (2009)
 Tanatosu (2011), Chihiro Sakai
 Karappo (2012), Sheena
 Helter Skelter (manga) (2012), Mako
 Sesshi 100-do no Binetsu (2015), Chinami Ezaki
 Ju-on: The Final Curse (2015), Mai Shono

Stage
 BOB (Panasonic Globe Theatre, Sankei Hall Breezé, 27 April 2012 – 29 May 2012), Natsumi Tabata
 Love Letters: 2012 22nd Anniversary (Parco Theater at Shibuya, 21 September 2012), Melissa Gardner

Web dramas
 Five Stories of Ikspiari (Open Cast)
 Overwork (Vision Factory, 2009)
 10-ka Kan de Unmei no Koibito o Mitsukeru Houhou (BeeTV, 20 April 2014), Nijiko Kiyose

Dubbing
 Jack the Giant Slayer (2013), Princess Isabelle

Narrations
 Urusawa Naoki's Manben (2015-present), Voice Over Narrator

Commercials
 Asian2 - Country Road (2007)

Bibliography

Photobooks
 Ai Tai (Saibunkan, February 2005), 
 A (Wani Books, 27 September 2013),

Discography

Singles
 Wish (Toy's Factory, 12 April 2000)

Video/DVDs
 The 1st. (Rolans Film, 25 February 2005)
 Airinku (Line Communications, 20 May 2005)

Award
 33rd Japan Academy Prize Best Newcomer for NTV drama 20th Century Boys

References

External links
 Official Profile on Vision Factory 
  

1984 births
Japanese television personalities
Living people
Actors from Hyōgo Prefecture
Horikoshi High School alumni
21st-century Japanese actresses
Association footballers' wives and girlfriends